Cruise Into Terror is a 1978 American made-for-television horror film directed by Bruce Kessler. The film originally premiered February 3, 1978 on ABC. The all-star supporting cast features (in alphabetical order) Dirk Benedict, Frank Converse, John Forsythe, Christopher George, Lynda Day George, Lee Meriwether, Ray Milland, Hugh O'Brian, Stella Stevens, Roger E. Mosley, and Marshall Thompson.

Plot
A commercial pleasure ship, cruising near the Gulf of Mexico, brings aboard a sunken Egyptian sarcophagus which contains the son of Satan.

Cast
Dirk Benedict as Simon Mclane
Frank Converse as Matt Lazarus
John Forsythe as Reverend Charles Mather
Christopher George as Neal Barry
Lynda Day George as Sandra Barry
Jo Ann Harris as Judy Haines
Lee Meriwether as Lil Mather
Ray Milland as Dr. Isiah Bakkun
Hugh O'Brian as Captain Andrews
Stella Stevens as Marilyn Magnesun
Roger E. Mosley as Nathan
Marshall Thompson as Bennett

References

External links

  
 

1978 television films
1978 films
1978 horror films
ABC network original films
American horror television films
American supernatural horror films
Films set on ships
Films set in the Caribbean
Films produced by Aaron Spelling
1970s supernatural horror films
Films directed by Bruce Kessler
1970s English-language films
1970s American films